TCAR, Tcar, tcar, or similar may refer to:

 Trans-carotid artery revascularization, a medical procedure used to prevent stroke
 Transports en Commun de l'Agglomération Rouennaise, the French transport agency